Fiona Helen Worts (born 30 January 1996) is an English footballer who plays for Adelaide United of the Australian A-League Women.

Worts was also a regular in the FA Women's Championship in England where she spent time with Leicester City and Coventry United. During her time with Leicester she scored 36 times in 54 appearances.

For the 2020–21 W-League season, Worts signed with Adelaide United after also having spent some time playing in the National Premier Leagues Women's for Adelaide University. In 2021–22 she was the top goal scorer in the rebranded A-League Women and won the Julie Dolan Medal. In March 2022 she agreed her return to Adelaide United for the following season, but joined Norwegian Toppserien club LSK Kvinner FK on loan in the meantime.

Worts also has a degree in Mathematics from the University of Leeds. During her successful 2021–22 season in Australia she combined her football career with working in McDonald's.

References

External links 

1996 births
Living people
A-League Women players
Adelaide United FC (A-League Women) players
Women's association football forwards
Coventry United W.F.C. players
Women's Championship (England) players
English women's footballers
Leicester City W.F.C. players
Expatriate women's soccer players in Australia
Expatriate women's footballers in Norway
English expatriate sportspeople in Norway
English expatriate sportspeople in Australia
Leeds City Vixens L.F.C. players
LSK Kvinner FK players
Toppserien players
Footballers from Nottingham
Alumni of the University of Leeds